Vice-Admiral John Pakenham (1743–1807) was a Royal Navy officer who became Commander-in-Chief of the Jamaica Station.

Naval career
Promoted to post captain in 1780, Pakenham briefly served as Commander-in-Chief of the Jamaica Station in 1785 before going on to command the third-rate HMS Gibraltar in 1796 and the third-rate HMS Ajax in July 1798 in the Channel. Promoted to rear-admiral in 1799 and to vice-admiral in 1804, he died at Lowestoft in Suffolk in 1807.

References

Sources

Royal Navy vice admirals
1743 births
1807 deaths